Rohnert Park station is a Sonoma–Marin Area Rail Transit station in the city of the same name. It opened to preview service on June 29, 2017; full commuter service commenced on August 25, 2017. It is located on the Rohnert Park Expressway. The city's station was initially to be located further north near Golf Course Drive, but these plans were amended, resulting in the current location.

References

External links

Rohnert Park Station

Railway stations in the United States opened in 2017
Sonoma-Marin Area Rail Transit stations in Sonoma County
Rohnert Park, California
2017 establishments in California